Aggie Soccer Stadium may refer to:

Aggie Soccer Stadium (UC Davis), commonly called Aggie Field, University of California, Davis (Davis, California)
Aggie Soccer Stadium (Texas A&M), now known as Ellis Field, at Texas A&M University (College Station, Texas)